Antigius attilia is a butterfly of the family Lycaenidae. It is widespread from Japan, the Korean Peninsula, the Russian Far East throughout northern, central and western China to Taiwan.

The larvae feed on Quercus serrata, Quercus acutissima, Quercus variabilis, Quercus mongolica, Quercus dentate and Quercus aliena. Subspecies yamanakashoji has been recorded on Quercus acutissima.

Subspecies
Antigius attilia atilla
Antigius attilia tropicanus (Myanmar)
Antigius attilia yamanakashoji (Japan)
Antigius attilia obsoletus (Taiwan)

External links
A new species of Antigius (Lepidoptera: Lycaenidae: Theclini) from Taiwan

Theclini